= Sphagniana sphagnorum =

Scientific classification
- Kingdom: Animalia
- Phylum: Arthropoda
- Clade: Pancrustacea
- Class: Insecta
- Order: Orthoptera
- Suborder: Ensifera
- Family: Tettigoniidae
- Genus: Sphagniana
- Species: S. sphagnorum

Binomial name
- Sphagniana sphagnorum (Walker, 1869)

Synonyms
- Metrioptera sphagnorum

Species of cricket-like animal

Sphagniana sphagnorum, the bog katydid, is the only species in the family Tettigoniidae (order Orthoptera) endemic to Canada. It frequents black-spruce sphagnum bogs across the Canadian northwest from Ontario to the Yukon. The two-part song of the males is remarkable among acoustic insects for alternating between two sound spectra: high audio sound frequencies are changed for ultrasonic frequencies every quarter second (Morris 1970). The forewings rub to and fro, drawing a scraper on one forewing along a row of teeth (file) on the other forewing and sending thin glassy wing cells into oscillation to radiate sound; two different regions of this file are used for the two spectra (Morris & Pipher 1972).
